Brush Lake State Park is a public recreation area located four miles east of the community of Dagmar, Montana. The park surrounds three sides of the highly alkaline, sixty-foot-deep Brush Lake.

History
Brush Lake became a popular gathering place in the early years of the twentieth century, when residents of the surrounding communities were drawn to its clear, deep, spring-fed waters. Hans Christian Hansen built a summer resort on the lake after filing homesteading papers in 1914. A bar and cafe were added to the site by 1920, with a dance hall added in the 1940s. In 2004, the state purchased 450 acres surrounding the northern half of the lake to create a state park, while the lake's southern portion remained in private hands.

Activities and amenities
The park offers hiking, swimming, picnicking and camping facilities as well as opportunities for boating and canoeing. The lake's high mineral content makes it inhospitable to fish life.

References

External links
Brush Lake State Park Montana Fish, Wildlife & Parks
Brush Lake State Park Trail Map Montana Fish, Wildlife & Parks

State parks of Montana
Protected areas of Sheridan County, Montana
Protected areas established in 2004
2004 establishments in Montana